Pizza Grandiosa (colloquially also referred to simply as Grandiosa or Grandis) is the most popular brand of frozen pizza in Norway.

History
Production of the original Grandiosa started on 11 February 1980, then produced by Nora (now Stabburet) in Stranda in Sunnmøre. Grandiosa was one of the first frozen pizzas produced in Norway. The pizza became vastly popular and is still the most sold pizza brand in Norway, in defiance of increasing competition from other local and international brands. In 2002 Stabburet responded to increased competition in the frozen food segment by reviving the brand with creative marketing and several new versions of Grandiosa.  The pizza is also exported in smaller numbers to the neighbouring countries Sweden, Finland, Denmark, Poland and Iceland.

The pizza is subject to a lot of humorous debate, and is unquestionably a piece of modern culture, loathed and loved by Norwegians. It has been called the "modern national dish" by some, others claim it is "a piece of cardboard", "laziness in a box" and even "refrigerated evil".

In 2005 Grandiosa got its own unofficial book, Grandiosaland. The book contains stories about a man who had a broken jaw and had to put his Grandiosa in a blender to eat it, and many other stories about Grandiosa, and favourite Norwegian pastimes such as hyttetur (trips to cabins typically located close to the sea/fjords or up in the mountains), russetid (the close to lawless celebration of the high school graduation) and dugnad (the collective activity of helping one another with mutual tasks through unpaid and voluntary work of importance to the community).

Market
Stabburet has used creative marketing to promote Grandiosa. Examples are their very successful SMS-vote marketing campaign for selecting new addition to the pizza in 2004. 

Another example is their hit mobile ring tone "Respekt for Grandiosa" (Respect for Grandiosa) which was downloaded 300,000 times within 1.5 months. The song went #1 in Norway, topping the charts for 8 weeks, beginning in March of 2006.

A total of 260 million pizzas have been sold. Twenty-four million units of Grandiosa are produced each year for the 5,4 million citizens of Norway.

Varieties
In addition to the original Grandiosa, there exist different varieties.

See also
 List of frozen food brands

References

External links

 Grandiosa Norway
 Grandiosa Finland
 Grandiosa Sweden

Norwegian cuisine
Orkla ASA
Frozen pizza brands